Xylota dolini is a species of hoverfly in the family Syrphidae.

Distribution
Azerbaijan.

References

Eristalinae
Insects described in 2000
Diptera of Asia